, real name , is a Japanese singer-songwriter born 25 March 1959 in Ibaraki, Osaka Prefecture, Japan. He is represented by the talent management firm Daikan'yama Production, and releases works through Daipro-X, a record company which is a subsidiary of Daikan'yama.

He made his professional singer-songwriter debut in 1983 by winning two major awards and being named the "Rookie of the Year" for his single .

Biography
Kamon was born as Tatsuo Torikai on 25 March 1959 in Ibaraki, Osaka Prefecture, Japan.  He graduated from Chūjō Elementary School and Yōsei Junior High, both part of the Ibaraki municipal school system. While attending Osaka Prefectural Kasugaoka High School, he began studying as an apprentice to rakugo master Tsuruko Shōfukutei beginning in 1975. After graduating, he became a regular guest on the MBS Young Town radio program from April 1978 until September 1980. He also co-hosted the show with Naoko Kawai from July 1984 to September 1992.

In 1981, after meeting Keisuke Kuwata of the Southern All Stars, he changed his name to "Kamon" from "Torikai" in honor of Kuwata's pseudonym of Yūzō Kamon. Kamon made his professional debut as a recording artist on 21 July 1983 with the release of his single Yankee no Niichan no Uta. He won both the Yomiuri TV Cable Broadcast First Prize and the TBS Cable Broadcast First Prize and was named Rookie of the Year for this release.

Kaeuta Medley, a single released in 1991, sold over 820,000 copies and was Kamon's first big hit. In 2000, Kamon changed to his current "trademark" look by bleaching his hair.

Kamon married for the first time on 15 January 2009.

Discography

Singles

References

1959 births
Japanese male singer-songwriters
Japanese singer-songwriters
Living people
People from Ibaraki, Osaka
Musicians from Osaka Prefecture